Siciliano is a surname. Notable people with the surname include:

Andrew Siciliano (born 1974), American sports television anchor, reporter and radio broadcaster
Angelo Siciliano (aka Charles Atlas, 1892-1972), Italian-born American bodybuilder
Antonio Siciliano (born 1936), Italian film editor
Barbara Siciliano (born 1972), Italian volleyball player
Bruno Siciliano (footballer) (born 1938), Brazilian footballer
Dani Siciliano, American singer
Enzo Siciliano (1934–2006), Italian writer, playwright, literary critic and intellectual
Jake Siciliano (born 1998), American actor
Louis Siciliano (born 1975), Italian music composer,
Robert Siciliano (born 1968), American security analyst, author and media personality